Quixotism ( or ; adj. quixotic) is impracticality in pursuit of ideals, especially those ideals manifested by rash, lofty and romantic ideas or extravagantly chivalrous action. It also serves to describe an idealism without regard to practicality. An impulsive person or act might be regarded as quixotic.

Quixotism is usually related to "over-idealism", meaning an idealism that doesn't take consequence or absurdity into account. It is also related to naïve romanticism and to utopianism.

Origin
Quixotism as a term or a quality appeared after the publication of Don Quixote in 1605. Don Quixote, the hero of this novel, written by Spanish author Miguel de Cervantes Saavedra, dreams up a romantic ideal world which he believes to be real, and acts on this idealism, which most famously leads him into imaginary fights with windmills that he regards as giants, leading to the related metaphor of "tilting at windmills".

Already in the 17th century the term quixote was used to describe a person who does not distinguish between reality and imagination. The poet John Cleveland wrote in 1644, in his book :

The word quixotism is mentioned, for the first time, in Pulpit Popery, True Popery (1688):

Spanish language opposes quijotesco ("Quixotic") with sanchopancesco ("lacking idealism, accommodating and chuckling" after Sancho Panza).

See also
Chūnibyō

References

Don Quixote
Emotions